Ram Karmi (1931 – 11 April 2013) was an Israeli architect. He was head of the Tel Aviv-based Ram Karmi Architects company, and is known for his Brutalist style.

Biography
Ram Karmi was born in Jerusalem. His father was architect Dov Karmi. Karmi grew up in Tel Aviv, served in the Israel Defense Forces in the 1948 Arab–Israeli War. He was one of the first soldiers to join the Nahal.

He studied architecture at the Technion, Haifa, and Architectural Association School of Architecture, London in 1951–56. His father, Dov Karmi, was also an architect and won the Israel Prize in 1957. His sister, the architect Ada Karmi-Melamede, was also awarded the Israel Prize for architecture, in 2007. He was married to Rivka Karmi-Edry with whom he has a son and two daughters. He also has two sons and a daughter from a previous marriage.

Architectural career

Early in his career Ram Karmi was employed in his father's office where he worked on plans for the Knesset along with the design competition winner Joseph Klarwein. Karmi planned the Negev Center, Beersheba, in 1960 and El Al building, Tel Aviv, in 1963.  He continued his architectural work while lecturing at the Technion, designing the Amal School in Tel Aviv and the Tel Aviv Central Bus Station.

According to Karmi, after the 1967 Six-Day War, the changed atmosphere in Israeli society caused him to re-think his brutalist style. In 1974, Karmi voluntarily became the chief architect in the Housing and Construction Minister of Israel, a position he held until 1979, and worked to re-design the near-ubiquitous public housing projects in Israel. 1981 he finished the Hecht Synagogue in Jerusalem.

In 1986 Karmi and his sister Ada Karmi-Melamede were invited to participate in the international competition for the design of the Supreme Court of Israel which they won. The building, designed by Karmi and Karmi-Melamede opened in 1992. New York Times architecture critic Paul Goldberger wrote of Karmi's design, "the sharpness of the Mediterranean architectural tradition and the dignity of the law are here married with remarkable grace." Beginning in 2007, Karmi was the architect in charge of renovating the Habima Theatre.

Academic career
Karmi taught at the Technion, Haifa between 1964 and 1994. He lectured at MIT, Columbia University and the University of Houston.

Karmi was a full professor at the School of Architecture of Ariel University Center of Samaria.

Criticism
The massive Tel Aviv Central Bus Station, which Karmi designed along with the architects Tzvi Komet and Ya'el Rothschild, has been criticized over the years for being a difficult to navigate bloated structure which also destroyed the neighborhood it was built in, despite numerous advertising campaigns and improvements. In an interview, Haim Avigal, the CEO of the station from 2005, downplayed the navigation complaints, but said that "if I caught the architect who designed this building, I'd beat him up". In 2010, his renovation of Habima Theatre, which at the time was still under way after three years of development, was fiercely criticized.

Karmi was also involved in the Holyland Park project in Jerusalem, which is called the "Monster on the Hill" by many Jerusalemites.

Awards
Karmi won the following awards:
 Israel Prize, 2002 – for architecture.
 Rechter Prize:
 1967 – for the Negev Center in Beersheba;
 1999 – for the Children's Memorial (Yad LaYeled) in the Ghetto Fighters' House.
 Reinholds Prize, 1969 – for a mixed residential/commercial project in Beersheba.
 Rokach Prize:
 1965 – for the El Al building in Tel Aviv;
 1970 – for residential buildings in Be'eri St., Tel Aviv.

Published works
 Adrikhalut Lirit (lit. Lyric Architecture) (2001). Israeli Ministry of Defense.

See also
List of Israel Prize recipients

References

External links 
 The Knesset Building in Giv’at Ram: Planning and Construction
 The Knesset Building - Architectural Highlights by Dr. Susan Hattis Rolef

1931 births
Jewish architects
Israeli architects
Israel Prize in architecture recipients
Brutalist architects
Academic staff of Ariel University
Massachusetts Institute of Technology faculty
University of Houston faculty
Columbia University faculty
Technion – Israel Institute of Technology alumni
Israeli Jews
Israeli people of Ukrainian-Jewish descent
People from Tel Aviv
2013 deaths